Claudia Ferraris (born 5 October 1988 in Bergamo, Lombardia, Italy) is the winner of the Miss Universo Italia 2008 pageant that was held at the Palazzo dei Congressi in Riccione, Emilia-Romagna on 31 May 2008. She represented Italy at the Miss Universe 2008 pageant in Nha Trang, Vietnam on 14 July. She placed in the top 10, ranking 9th at the end of the competition. In 2006, she had entered the Miss Italia pageant as Miss Lombardia and had placed among the top 10 there as well.

Claudia's scores were 7.671 in the swimsuit competition (10th) and 7.729 in the evening gown competition (9th and her final official placement). During the stay in Vietnam for the pageant, Claudia and Miss Venezuela Dayana Mendoza were roommates, and became close friends. After Mendoza's win, Claudia was invited to Caracas, Venezuela and appeared on television along with Mendoza herself during Sabado Sensacional on the Venevision channel as part of a show celebrating Mendoza's victory.
 
Claudia stands  and she's a Libra. She speaks English, she enjoys music, dancing, reading, volleyball and working out and her dream is to someday become the editor of a fashion magazine.

References

Living people
1988 births
Miss Universe 2008 contestants
Italian female models
People from Bergamo
Italian beauty pageant winners